Reasi Assembly constituency is one of the 87 constituencies in the Jammu and Kashmir Legislative Assembly of Jammu and Kashmir a north state of India. Reasi is also part of Udhampur Lok Sabha constituency.

Member of Legislative Assembly

 1962: Rishi Kumar Kaushal, Praja Parishad
 1967: B. L. Kohstani, Indian National Congress
 1972: Rishi Kumar Kaushal, Bharatiya Jan Sangh
 1977: Rishi Kumar Kaushal, Janata Party
 1983: Jagjivan Lal, Jammu & Kashmir National Conference
 1987: Mohammad Ayub Khan, Indian National Congress
 1996: Jagjivan Lal, Janata Dal
 2002: Jugal Kishore, Indian National Congress
 2008: Baldev Raj, Bhartiya Janata Party

Election results

2014

See also
 Reasi
 Reasi district
 List of constituencies of Jammu and Kashmir Legislative Assembly

References

Assembly constituencies of Jammu and Kashmir
Reasi district